SLIK Corporation is a manufacturer and brand of camera tripods with headquarters located in Hidaka City, Japan.

History
The company was founded in 1956 as SLICK Elevator Tripod Co., Ltd. by a mechanical engineer and photography enthusiast, Takatoshi Shiraishi. Shiraishi started designing and building his own tripods in a suburb of Tokyo, Japan, in 1948. In 1963, the company name was changed to SLICK Tripod Co., Ltd.  In 1967 a factory was constructed in Saitama Prefecture, Japan.  In 1988, SLIK (Thailand) Co., Ltd. was established with a factory located in a Bangkok, Thailand suburb.  In 1989, sales and manufacturing operations were consolidated and the company was renamed SLIK Corporation.

References

External links
 http://www.slik.co.jp/slik_com/ SLIK Japan
 https://slikusa.com/ SLIK USA

Photography equipment
Photography companies of Japan